Orbea variegata is a species of flowering plant in the family Apocynaceae, known as the star flower. It is native to the coastal belt of the Western Cape, South Africa, growing actively during the winter rainfall season. It is an invasive species in southern Australia.

Description
The flowers may show regular (banded) markings, or irregular ones. They have five pointed or blunt lobes surrounding a central, pentagonal annulus (corona). The flowers may have a faint carrion smell to attract potential insect pollinators.

Cultivation
This plant is popular in cultivation, and is often sold under its former name Stapelia variegata. It has many common names, including starfish plant, starfish cactus, carrion cactus, carrion flower, toad cactus, toad plant. It is not closely related to the true cactus family. When grown as an ornamental plant in temperate zones it requires protection, as it does not tolerate freezing temperatures. It is best grown under glass, in similar conditions to cacti.

In the UK it has gained the Royal Horticultural Society’s Award of Garden Merit.

Gallery

References

Asclepiadoideae
Flora of the Cape Provinces